Lady May Helen Emma Abel Smith (formerly Lady May Cambridge, née Princess May of Teck; 23 January 1906 – 29 May 1994) was a relative of the British royal family. She was a great-granddaughter of Queen Victoria and a niece of Queen Mary. She led a private life in Britain. From 1958 until 1966, she lived in Brisbane, while her husband, Sir Henry Abel Smith, served as the governor of Queensland.

Early life
She was born as Her Serene Highness Princess May Helen Emma of Teck at Claremont House, near Esher in Surrey, England. Her parents were Prince Alexander of Teck, great-grandson of King George III, and the former Princess Alice of Albany, granddaughter of Queen Victoria. She was named May after her paternal aunt Princess Victoria Mary of Teck (later Queen Mary) who was married to King George V, Helen after her maternal grandmother Princess Helena, Duchess of Albany and Emma after her maternal great-aunt Queen Emma of the Netherlands. During the First World War, anti-German feeling led her family to abandon their German titles. Princess May of Teck thus became known as Lady May Cambridge, after her father assumed the last name Cambridge and was granted the Earldom of Athlone.

Lady May served as a bridesmaid in 1919 to Princess Patricia of Connaught; in 1922 to her first cousin Princess Mary; and in 1923 to Lady Elizabeth Bowes-Lyon on her marriage to Mary's brother the Duke of York (later King George VI).

Marriage
Lady May married Sir Henry Abel Smith, member of the rich Smith family, on 24 October 1931 in Balcombe, Sussex, close to the Athlone residence at Brantridge Park. One of the bridesmaids,
Princess Ingrid of Sweden, introduced her brother Prince Gustaf Adolf to his future wife, Princess Sibylla of Saxe-Coburg-Gotha, who was also a bridesmaid. Elizabeth II attended her wedding as a bridesmaid at the age of 5.

Sir Henry and Lady May Abel Smith were married for over 60 years and had three children:
Anne Mary Sibylla Abel Smith (born 28 July 1932), mother of the Conservative Member of Parliament Ian Liddell-Grainger and first wife of David Liddell-Grainger of Ayton Castle, Scottish Borders
Colonel Richard Francis Abel Smith (11 October 1933 – 23 December 2004)
Elizabeth Alice Abel Smith (born 5 September 1936)

Later life
Lady May, being only a distant relative of the royal family, did not carry out any royal duties. She attended some major royal events such as the coronation of Queen Elizabeth II and the wedding of Charles, Prince of Wales, and Lady Diana Spencer. Between 1958 and 1966, Sir Henry Abel Smith served as the governor of Queensland. Lady May accompanied him to Brisbane as vice-regal consort. They retired in 1975 to Barton Lodge at Winkfield in Berkshire, England.

Lady May died in hospital one year after her husband. They are both buried at the Royal Burial Ground, Frogmore, not far from Windsor Castle. Her funeral was held at St George's Chapel, Windsor Castle, Windsor, on 9 June 1994. It was attended by the Duke of Gloucester and Princess Alexandra, representing the royal family.

References

1906 births
1994 deaths
People from Esher
Daughters of British earls
May
May
Burials at the Royal Burial Ground, Frogmore
German princesses
Wives of knights
Spouses of Queensland Governors
People from Balcombe, West Sussex